Atanasio Amisse Canira (born 2 May 1962 in Mossoril, Nampula Province) is a Mozambican clergyman, Bishop of Lichinga. He was ordained on 12 December 1993 to the sacrament of Holy Orders for the diocese of Nacala. On February 8, 2015, Pope Francis appointed him as Bishop of Lichinga, and he was ordained as bishop by the Bishop of Nacala, Germano Grachane, the Bishop of Xai-Xai, Lucio Andrice Muandula, and the Bishop Emeritus of Lichinga, Elio Giovanni Greselin on 22 March.

References

21st-century Roman Catholic bishops in Mozambique
1962 births
Living people
People from Nampula Province
Roman Catholic bishops of Lichinga